The Saturn C-3 was the third rocket in the Saturn C series studied from 1959 to 1962. The design was for a three-stage launch vehicle that could launch  to low Earth orbit and send  to the Moon via trans-lunar injection.

U.S. President Kennedy's proposal on May 25, 1961, of an explicit crewed lunar landing goal spurred NASA to solidify its launch vehicle requirements for a lunar landing. A week earlier, William Fleming (Office of Space Flight Programs, NASA Headquarters) chaired an ad hoc committee to conduct a six-week study of the requirements for a lunar landing. Judging the direct ascent approach to be the most feasible, they concentrated their attention accordingly, and proposed circumlunar flights in late 1965 using the Saturn C-3 launch vehicle.

In early June 1961, Bruce Lundin, deputy director of the Lewis Research Center, led a week-long study of six different rendezvous possibilities. The alternatives included Earth-orbital rendezvous (EOR), lunar-orbital rendezvous (LOR), Earth and lunar rendezvous, and rendezvous on the lunar surface, employing Saturn C-1s, C-3s, and Nova designs. Lundin's committee concluded that rendezvous enjoyed distinct advantages over direct ascent and recommended an Earth-orbital rendezvous using two or three Saturn C-3s.

NASA announced on September 7, 1961, that the government-owned Michoud Ordnance Plant near New Orleans, Louisiana, would be the site for fabrication and assembly of the Saturn C-3 first stage as well as larger vehicles in the Saturn program. Finalists were two government-owned plants in St. Louis and New Orleans. The height of the factory roof at Michoud meant that a launch vehicle with eight F-1 engines (Nova class, Saturn C-8) could not be built; four or five engines (first stage) would have to be the maximum (Saturn C-5)

This decision ended consideration of a Nova class launch vehicle for a direct ascent to the Moon or as a heavy-lift companion with the Saturn C-3 for Earth orbit rendezvous.

Lunar mission design

Direct Ascent
During various Nova's proposal, a Modular Nova concept made up of clustering the first stage of C-3 were proposed.

Earth orbit rendezvous
The Marshall Space Flight Center in Huntsville, Alabama developed an Earth orbit rendezvous proposal (EOR) for the Apollo program in 1960–1961. The proposal used a series of small rockets half the size of a Saturn V to launch different components of a spacecraft headed to the Moon. These components would be assembled in orbit around the Earth, then sent to the Moon via trans-lunar injection. In order to test and validate the feasibility of the EOR approach for the Apollo program, Project Gemini was founded with this objective: "To effect rendezvous and docking with another vehicle (Agena target vehicle), and to maneuver the combined spacecraft using the propulsion system of the target vehicle".

The Saturn C-3 was the primary launch vehicle for Earth orbit rendezvous. The booster consisted of a first stage containing two Saturn V F-1 engines, a second stage containing four powerful J-2 engines, and the S-IV stage from a Saturn I booster. Only the S-IV stage of the Saturn C-3 was developed and flown, but all of the specified engines were used on the Saturn V rocket which took men to the Moon.

Lunar orbit rendezvous
The concept of Lunar orbit rendezvous (LOR) was studied at Langley Research Center as early as 1960. John Houbolt's memorandum advocating LOR for lunar missions in November 1961 to Robert Seamans outlined the usage of the Saturn C-3 launch vehicle, and avoiding complex large boosters and lunar landers.

After six months of further discussion at NASA, in the summer of 1962, Langley Research Center's Lunar orbit rendezvous (LOR) proposal was officially selected as the mission configuration for the Apollo program on November 7, 1962. By the end of 1962, the Saturn C-3 design was deemed not necessary for Apollo program requirements as larger boosters (Saturn C-4, Saturn C-5) were then proposed, hence further work on the Saturn C-3 was cancelled.

Variants and derivatives

Since 1961, a number of variants of the Saturn C-3 have been studied, proposed, and funded. The most extensive studies focused on the Saturn C-3B variants before the end of 1962, when lunar orbit rendezvous was selected and Saturn C-5 development approved. The common theme of these variants is the first stage with at least  of sea-level thrust (SL).

The lack of a Saturn C-3 launch vehicle in 1965 created a large payload gap (LEO) between the Saturn IB's  capacity and the two-stage Saturn V's  capability. In the mid-1960s NASA's Marshall Space Flight Center (MSFC) initiated several studies for a launch vehicle to fill this payload capacity gap and to extend the capabilities of the Saturn family. Three companies provided proposals to MSFC for this requirement: Martin Marietta (builder of Atlas, Titan vehicles), Boeing (builder of S-1B and S-1C first stages), and North American (builder of the S-II second stage).

Saturn C-3B
The Saturn C-3B revision (1961) increased the total thrust of the three stages to 17,200 kN. The eventual first stage for the Saturn V (S-IC) would use this same diameter, but add 8 meters to its length. A further consideration added a third F-1 engine to the first stage.
The S-II, second stage diameter would be  in length.

The 3-stage version would use the S-IV stage, with a diameter of 5.5 meters and 12.2 meters in length.

Saturn C-3BN

The Saturn C-3BN revision (1961) would use the NERVA for the third stage in this launch vehicle. The NERVA technology has been studied and proposed since mid-1950s for future space exploration.

Saturn INT-20

On 7 October 1966, Boeing submitted a Final Report to the NASA Marshall Space Flight Center, "Studies of Improved Saturn V Vehicles and Intermediate Payload Vehicles". That report outlined the Saturn INT-20, an intermediate two-stage launch vehicle with an S-1C first stage using three or four F-1 engines, and an S-IVB as the second stage with one J-2 engine. The vehicle's payload capacity for LEO would be 45,000 to 60,000 kg, comparable to the earlier Saturn C-3 design (1961). Boeing projected delivery and first flight in 1970, based on a decision by 1967.

Saturn II

The Saturn II was a series of American expendable launch vehicles, studied by North American Aviation (NAA, later Rockwell) in 1966, under the NASA Marshall Space Flight Center (MSFC) and derived from components of the Saturn V rocket used for the Apollo program. The North American designs focused on eliminating the Boeing-built S-IC first stage and using North American's S-II second stage for the launch vehicle core. The intent of the study was to eliminate production of the Saturn IB, and create a lower-cost heavy launch vehicle based on current (1966) Saturn V hardware.

Post-Apollo development
The need for a launch vehicle of Saturn C-3 capacity (45 tonnes to LEO) continued beyond the Apollo program. Cape Canaveral Air Force Station Space Launch Complex 37, initially designed to serve the Saturn I and I-B, was planned for eventual Saturn C-3 usage, but it was deactivated in 1972. In 2001, Boeing refurbished the complex for its Delta IV EELV launch vehicle. The Delta IV Heavy variant can only launch 22.5 tonnes to LEO.
 
The 1986 Space Shuttle Challenger disaster and 2010 Space Launch System program resulted in renewed proposals for Saturn C-3 derivatives using the Rocketdyne F-1A engines with existing booster cores and tooling (10m - Saturn S-IC stage; 8.4m - Space Shuttle external tank; 5.1m - Delta IV Common Booster Core).

Jarvis

After the Space Shuttle Challenger disaster, the United States Air Force (USAF) and National Aeronautics and Space Administration (NASA) conducted a joint Advanced Launch System study (1987-1990). Hughes Aircraft and Boeing dusted off the earlier Saturn C-3 design and submitted their proposal for the Jarvis launch vehicle.

Designed to lift 38 tons to LEO, it would utilize F-1 and J-2 rocket engines and tooling in storage from the Saturn V rocket program along with more recent Shuttle-era technologies to provide lower launch costs.

See also 
 Falcon Heavy
 Vulcan Centaur
 New Glenn
 Jarvis (rocket)
 Delta IV Heavy

References

Inline citations

Bibliography

 Bilstein, Roger E, Stages to Saturn, US Government Printing Office, 1980. . An excellent account of the evolution, design, and development of the Saturn launch vehicles.
 Stuhlinger, Ernst, et al., Astronautical Engineering and Science: From Peenemuende to Planetary Space, McGraw-Hill, New York, 1964.
 Jet Propulsion Lab; NASA Report - October 2, 1961; Some Interrelationships and Long-Range Implications of C-3 Lunar Rendezvous and solid Nova vehicle concepts. Accessed at: https://ntrs.nasa.gov/archive/nasa/casi.ntrs.nasa.gov/19740072519_1974072519.pdf.
 Robert P. Smith, Apollo Projects Office, NASA Report, Project Apollo - A description of a Saturn C-3 and Nova vehicle. July 25, 1961. Accessed at: https://ntrs.nasa.gov/archive/nasa/casi.ntrs.nasa.gov/19790076768_1979076768.pdf.
 NASA, "Earth Orbital Rendezvous for an Early Manned Lunar Landing," pt. I, "Summary Report of Ad Hoc Task Group Study" [Heaton Report], August 1961.
 David S. Akens, Saturn Illustrated Chronology: Saturn's First Eleven Years, April 1957 through April 1968, 5th ed., MHR-5 (Huntsville, Alabama: MSFC, 20 Jan. 1971).
 Boeing Study, Marshall Space Flight Center, '"Final Report - Studies of Improved Saturn V Vehicles and Intermediate Payload Vehicles'", October 7, 1966, Accessed at: http://www.astronautix.com/data/satvint.pdf

Apollo program
C3
Cancelled space launch vehicles